Luhaga Joelson Mpina (born 5 May 1975) is a Tanzanian CCM politician and Member of Parliament for Kisesa constituency since 2005. He was the Minister of Livestock and Fisheries for 3 years in the Magufuli cabinet.

References

1975 births
Living people
Chama Cha Mapinduzi MPs
Tanzanian MPs 2005–2010
Tanzanian MPs 2010–2015
Meatu Secondary School alumni
Karatu Secondary School alumni
Mzumbe University alumni
Alumni of the University of Strathclyde
Tanzanian Roman Catholics